Riverview Park is a census-designated place in Muhlenberg Township, Berks County, Pennsylvania,  United States. As of the 2010 census, the population was 3,380 residents.

References

Populated places in Berks County, Pennsylvania